Huai'an County is a county in the northwest of Hebei, China. It is under the administration of Zhangjiakou City.

Administrative Divisions
Towns:
Chaigoubu, Zuowei, Toubaihu, Huai'ancheng

Townships:
Dukoubu Township, Diliutun Township, Xiwanbu Township, Xishacheng Township, Taipingzhuang Township, Wanghutun Township, Disanbu Township

Climate

References

External links

County-level divisions of Hebei
Zhangjiakou